George McDiarmid (1880–1946) was a Scottish professional footballer who played as a centre-half.

References

1880 births
1946 deaths
Footballers from Coatbridge
Scottish footballers
Association football defenders
Cambuslang Rangers F.C. players
Nottingham Forest F.C. players
Northampton Town F.C. players
Airdrieonians F.C. players
Grimsby Town F.C. players
Glossop North End A.F.C. players
Clyde F.C. players
Darlington F.C. players
English Football League players
Scottish Football League players
Scottish Junior Football Association players